Ocean Reef was an electoral district of the Legislative Assembly of Western Australia. It was located in Perth's northern suburbs, and was named after the suburb of Ocean Reef.

History
Ocean Reef was created at the 2007 redistribution out of most of the Mindarie electorate and parts of Joondalup and Hillarys. Its creation reflected both the growth of the City of Wanneroo region which now required three full electorates (Wanneroo, Mindarie and Girrawheen), and the increase in the number of metropolitan seats in accordance with the new one vote one value legislation.

Ocean Reef was a notional Labor seat upon its creation, but was one of a number of marginal seats that fell to the Liberal Party at the 2008 election.  Liberal candidate Albert Jacob won it on a swing of six percent.  He picked up a massive 16-point swing in 2013 amid the Liberals' landslide re-election victory. Ocean Reef was abolished in a 2015 redistribution, with effect from the 2017 state election. Its territory was distributed between Burns Beach (a new seat) and Joondalup.

Geography
Ocean Reef extends from the Wanneroo-Joondalup coastal boundary southwards, taking in the suburbs of Burns Beach, Iluka, Kallaroo, Kinross, Mullaloo, Ocean Reef and most of Currambine.

In the redistribution of 2011, the suburb of Mindarie was moved from the district of Mindarie into the district of Ocean Reef, effective at the 2013 election. The district of Mindarie was renamed Butler as a result.

Members for Ocean Reef

Election results

References

Former electoral districts of Western Australia
2008 establishments in Australia
Constituencies established in 2008
2017 disestablishments in Australia
Constituencies disestablished in 2017